Solomon Lewis Withey (April 21, 1820 – April 25, 1886) was a United States district judge of the United States District Court for the Western District of Michigan.

Education and career

Born in St. Albans, Vermont, Withey read law to enter the bar in 1843. He was in private practice in Grand Rapids, Michigan from 1843 to 1863. He was a probate judge for Kent County, Michigan from 1848 to 1852. He was a member of the Michigan Senate from 1861 to 1863.

Federal judicial service

District court service 

Withey was nominated by President Abraham Lincoln on March 10, 1863, to the United States District Court for the Western District of Michigan, to a new seat authorized by 12 Stat. 660. He was confirmed by the United States Senate on March 11, 1863, and received his commission the same day. His service terminated on April 25, 1886, due to his death in San Diego, California.

Sixth Circuit consideration

President Ulysses S. Grant nominated Withey to the United States Circuit Courts for the Sixth Circuit on December 17, 1869, and he was confirmed by the Senate on December 22, 1869, however he declined the appointment.

References

Sources

External links
 

1820 births
1886 deaths
Michigan state senators
Michigan state court judges
Judges of the United States District Court for the Western District of Michigan
United States federal judges appointed by Abraham Lincoln
19th-century American judges
People from Grand Rapids, Michigan
People from St. Albans, Vermont
United States federal judges admitted to the practice of law by reading law
19th-century American politicians